Day of Republika Srpska ( / ) is a national holiday of Republika Srpska proclaimed unconstitutional by the Constitutional Court of Bosnia and Herzegovina. The holiday is celebrated on 9 January, and its unofficial patron saint is Saint Archdeacon Stephen—historically being patron saint of medieval Kotromanić dynasty kings bearing their first name after him—which falls on the same day.

9 January 1992 
On 9 January 1992 in Sarajevo, the constitutional Assembly of the Serbian people in Bosnia and Herzegovina issued the Declaration of the proclamation of the Republic of Serbian people of Bosnia and Herzegovina, with a main goal of seceding from Republic of Bosnia and Herzegovina which merged with Republika Srpska into Bosnia and Herzegovina. The republic has been proclaimed on the territories of Serb Autonomous Regions, including the areas where Serbs were constituting a relative majority.

After 2015 constitutional ban

Constitutional Court of Bosnia and Herzegovina declared the holiday unconstitutional on 26 November 2015 stating that the main issue for it being coinciding with a religious holiday. The ruling was ignored by the Republika Srpska government.

In 2016, a referendum was held on the holiday, the referendum was also proclaimed unconstitutional by the Constitutional Court.

As recently as 2021, participants took part in celebrating the disputed Day of Republika Srpska, ignoring condemnation from Bosniak leaders and a ban imposed by the country's Constitutional Court. Despite the court ruling that the holiday was unconstitutional, and fierce criticism by Bosniaks and part of the international community, celebrations took place throughout Republika Srpska, including parades and performances.

See also 
 2016 Republika Srpska National Day referendum

References 

1992 establishments in Bosnia and Herzegovina
Recurring events established in 1992
January observances
Observances in Bosnia and Herzegovina
Republika Srpska
Republika Srpska